Sharmishta Roy is an Indian film art director and production designer who works predominantly in Hindi cinema.

Personal life 
Born to Sudhendu Roy, noted production designer of  Bimal Roy's films, like  Sujata (1959), Madhumati (1959) and  Bandini (1963), and Yash Chopra's  Silsila (1981), Chandni (1989), she assisted her father before starting out as an independent art director.

Select filmography

 Yeh Dillagi (1994)
 Ikke Pe Ikka (1994)
 Dilwale Dulhania Le Jayenge (1995)
 Dastak (1996)
 Dil To Pagal Hai (1997)
 Mrityudand (1997)
 Pyaar Kiya To Darna Kya (1998)
 Duplicate (1998)
 Jab Pyaar Kisise Hota Hai (1998)
 Achanak (1998)
 Kuch Kuch Hota Hai (1998)
 Taal (1999)
 Mohabbatein (2000)
 Kabhi Khushi Kabhie Gham... (2001)
 Koi... Mil Gaya (2003)
 Kal Ho Naa Ho  (2003)
 Meenaxi: A Tale of Three Cities (2004)
 Hum Tum (2004)
 Dev (2004)
 Veer-Zaara (2004)
 Bunty Aur Babli (2005)
 Kabhi Alvida Naa Kehna (2006)
 Ta Ra Rum Pum (2007)
 ‘’Anjaana Anjaani’’ (2010)
 Oh Kadhal Kanmani (2015)
 Kaatru Veliyidai (2017)
 Made in China (2019)

Awards 
She is a three time recipient of the Filmfare Award for Best Art Direction, for  Dil To Pagal Hai (1998), Kuch Kuch Hota Hai (1999) and Kabhi Khushi Kabhie Gham (2002), and a winner of the National Film Award for Best Production Design for Meenaxi: A Tale of Three Cities (2003).

References

External links
 

Indian art directors
Indian production designers
Living people
Filmfare Awards winners
Year of birth missing (living people)
Place of birth missing (living people)
Indian women designers
20th-century Indian designers
21st-century Indian designers
Best Production Design National Film Award winners
Women graphic designers
Women production designers
20th-century Indian women